The Surface Laptop Go is a portable computer introduced by Microsoft in October 2020. Marketed as a more affordable alternative to the brand's existing laptops, it is part of the company's Surface line of personal computing devices.

The laptop was announced alongside updated Surface Pro X models and several Surface accessories on 1 October 2020. Retail availability began on 13 October 2020.

Configuration

Features 

 10th Generation Intel® Core™ i5-1035G1 Processor (6 M Cache, up to 3.60 GHz clock rate).
 Intel UHD Graphics GPU.
 Preinstalled Operating system: Windows 10 Home in S mode
 12.4-inch PixelSense 1536 x 1024 (148 ppi) display with a 3:2 aspect ratio
 Claims to provide "more than 10 hours of battery life".
 Metal finish
 Full size keyboard, with 1.3 mm of travel
 Fingerprint Power Button with One Touch sign-in through Windows Hello (select models only)
 Discrete hardware TPM (commercial models only)

Hardware 
The Surface Laptop Go is a new addition to Microsoft's "Surface" lineup, with a claimed 13-hour battery life (when running Windows 10 S). The laptop is available in Platinum, Ice Blue and Sandstone colors.

It has a 12.4-inch "PixelSense" Display at 1536 × 1024 using a 3:2 aspect ratio with 10-point touch but without Surface Pen support unlike prior Surface devices.

The Surface Laptop Go uses a tenth-generation Intel Core i5 processor with Intel UHD Graphics. The base model of the device has 4 GB RAM and 64 GB eMMC storage.

The device has 1 USB-C and 1 USB-A port, alongside a headphone jack and a Surface Connect port for charging. The laptop also has Wi-Fi 6 and Bluetooth 5.

Select models have a fingerprint power button with Windows Hello.

Software 

Surface Laptop Go models ship with a pre-installed 64-bit version of Windows 10 Home in S Mode and a 30-day trial of Microsoft Office 365. Users may install software only from the Windows Store. Users can opt out of the S Mode of the OS and upgrade to the Home edition for free or Pro edition for a fee and be able to install apps from outside the Windows Store. Business models come pre-installed with Windows 10 Pro.

Timeline

References

External links 

 
 

Go
Computer-related introductions in 2020